Events from the year 1426 in Ireland.

Incumbent
Lord: Henry VI

Events
 William Fitz Thomas appointed Lord Chancellor of Ireland

Deaths

References